Gaspard Adolphe Chatin (30 November 1813 – 13 January 1901) was a French physician, mycologist and botanist who was born in Isère, and died in Les Essarts-le-Roi. He was the first to prove that goiter was related of iodine deficiencies.

He studied at the Faculté de Médecine in Paris and received his doctorate in May 1840. In 1841, he became Chief Pharmacist of the Beaujon Hospital in Paris. and in 1859, at the Hôtel-Dieu de Paris. He taught botany at the Ecole Superieure de Pharmacie, which he directed from 1874. In April 1886, there were student riots at the school, and his dismissal was demanded. He retired in August 1886 with the title of honorary director.

He was a member of the Académie Nationale de Médecine (1853) and the Académie des Sciences (1874). He was a member of the Société Botanique de France, which he led in 1862, 1878, 1886 and 1896. In 1878, he became an Officer of the Legion d'honneur.

His son was the botanist and zoologist Joannes Charles Melchior Chatin (1847–1912).

References 

 
 
 

19th-century French botanists
Members of the French Academy of Sciences
Officiers of the Légion d'honneur
1813 births
1901 deaths
19th-century French physicians